Kawasaki's Rose is a 2009 Czech drama film directed by Jan Hřebejk. The film was selected in the Czech Republic as the Czech entry for the Best Foreign Language Film at the 83rd Academy Awards, but it did not make the final shortlist. It had already won two prizes from independent juries at the Berlinale, as well as the Golden Kingfisher and viewers' prizes at the Czech festival Finale Plzen.

The film is a study of memory, the repressive Communist era, and reconciliation. Along with Honeymoon (Líbánky), and Innocence, with this film Hrebejk presents a loose trilogy of films in which shadows from the past come to haunt the present of its characters.

Cast
 Lenka Vlasáková as Lucie
 Milan Mikulčík as Luděk
 Martin Huba as Pavel
 Daniela Kolářová as Jana
 Antonín Kratochvíl as Bořek (as Antonín Kratochvíl)
 Anna Simonová as Bára
 Petra Hřebíčková as Radka
 Ladislav Chudík as Kafka
 Ladislav Smoček as Dr. Pešek
 Vladimír Kulhavý as Chief Physician

See also
 List of submissions to the 83rd Academy Awards for Best Foreign Language Film
 List of Czech submissions for the Academy Award for Best Foreign Language Film

References

External links

2009 films
2009 drama films
2000s Czech-language films
Films directed by Jan Hřebejk
Czech Lion Awards winners (films)
Golden Kingfisher winners
Czech drama films
2000s Czech films